James Gorman may refer to:
 James Gorman (VC) (1834–1882), English recipient of the Victoria Cross
 James S. Gorman (1850–1923), U.S. Representative from Michigan
 James Gorman (sport shooter) (1859–1929), American sport shooter
 James Gorman (politician) (1874–1950), English politician and trade unionist
 James Gorman (footballer, born in Dudley) (1882–?), English footballer (Stoke)
 James Gorman (footballer, born in Middlesbrough) (1882–1957), English footballer (Liverpool)
 James E. Gorman, president of the Chicago, Rock Island and Pacific Railroad, 1917–1933
 Jimmy Gorman (1910–1991), English footballer
 Lou Gorman (James Gerald Gorman, 1929–2011), American baseball executive
 James P. Gorman (born 1958), chairman and CEO, Morgan Stanley